James Luke Martin (born 11 November 1987 in Huddersfield, England) is an English rugby league footballer formerly with the Huddersfield Giants and Oldham RLFC (Heritage № 1235). It was announced in July 2007 that James will become a full-time member of the Giants' Super League squad for the 2008 season. Alongside his rugby career, James studies at Leeds University. James' previous clubs are Newsome Panthers, and Huddersfield Sharks.

References

External links
I'm delighted to be taking on a tough task: Martin, Huddersfield Examiner 25 July 2007
Tough night for the Seniors, Huddersfield Examiner 13 July 2007

1987 births
Living people
Batley Bulldogs players
English rugby league players
Huddersfield Giants players
Oldham R.L.F.C. players
Rugby league players from Huddersfield
Rugby league second-rows